Lubefu is a community in Sankuru province of the Democratic Republic of the Congo. 
It is the administrative center of the Lubefu territory.

References

Populated places in Sankuru